Glutamate-5-semialdehyde is a non-proteinogenic amino acid involved in both the biosynthesis and degradation of proline and arginine (via ornithine), as well as in the biosynthesis of antibiotics, such as carbapenems. It is synthesized by the reduction of glutamyl-5-phosphate by glutamate-5-semialdehyde dehydrogenase.

See also
 Glutamate-1-semialdehyde

References

Amino acids
Aldehydes
Aldehydic acids